Réguiny is a commune in the Morbihan department of Brittany in north-western France. Inhabitants of Réguiny are called in French Réguinois.

Geography
The river Ével forms most of the commune's southern border.

See also
Communes of the Morbihan department

References

External links

Official website 

 Mayors of Morbihan Association 

Communes of Morbihan